Fairy Tales Told for Children. New Collection is a collection of ten fairy tales by Hans Christian Andersen. The tales were published in a series of three installments by C. A. Reitzel in Copenhagen, Denmark between October 1838 and December 1841.

Contents

Fairy Tales Told for Children. New Collection. First Booklet 

Fairy Tales Told for Children. New Collection. First Booklet (Eventyr, fortalte for Børn. Ny Samling. Første Hefte) is the first installment. Was published on 2 October 1838 and contained three tales:
 "The Daisy" ("Gåseurten") tells of happy little daisy who is taken up with a plot of earth to line the bottom of a bird cage where a lark is held captive. When he dies and is given an elaborate funeral by the children, she is cast into the road and forgotten. She alone loved the lark, took joy in his song, and felt his suffering as her own.
 "The Steadfast Tin Soldier" ("Den standhaftige tinsoldat") is the story of a tin soldier who loves a paper ballerina.  He falls from the parlor window, and, after sailing in a paper boat down a storm drain, is swallowed by a fish. Eventually he is returned to the parlor table where still stands the ballerina. A boy throws the soldier into the fire and a draught carries the ballerina to his side.  They perish together; he is melted into a tin heart.
 "The Wild Swans" ("De vilde svaner"), a princess mutely undergoes the most dreadful trials in order to free her eleven brothers from a spell cast by an evil queen. When suspicions are aroused that she is a witch, she is sentenced to death but rescues her brothers at the last moment. Able then to speak, she tells her story and the king marries her.

Fairy Tales Told for Children. New Collection. Second Booklet 

Fairy Tales Told for Children. New Collection. Second Booklet (Eventyr, fortalte for Børn. Ny Samling. Andet Hefte) is the second installment. Was published on 19 October 1839 and contained three tales:
 "The Garden of Paradise" ("Paradisets have")
 "The Flying Trunk" ("Den flyvende Kuffert")
 "The Storks" ("Storkene")

Fairy Tales Told for Children. New Collection. Third Booklet 

Fairy Tales Told for Children. New Collection. Third Booklet (Eventyr, fortalte for Børn. Ny Samling. Tredie Hefte) is the third and last installment. Was published on 20 December 1841 and contained four tales:
 "Ole Lukoie" ("Ole Lukøje")
 "The Rose Elf" ("Rosen-Alfen")
 "The Swineherd" ("Svinedrengen")
 "The Buckwheat" ("Boghveden")

Background 

Andersen became an international celebrity with the publication of his novel The Improvisatore (1835) and Fairy Tales Told for Children. First Collection. (1835–1837), his first collection of fairy tales published in three booklets.  The collection consists of nine tales that includes "The Tinderbox", "The Princess and the Pea", "Thumbelina", "The Little Mermaid", and "The Emperor's New Clothes".  Andersen returned to the fairy tale genre in 1838 with another collection which, most importantly, included one tale that would change the genre forever and ever.

See also

References

External links 
 The Hans Christian Andersen Center: A website devoted to Andersen's life and works maintained by The University of Southern Denmark.
 "The Daisy". English translation by Jean Hersholt
 “The Steadfast Tin Solder“. English translation by Jean Hersholt
 The Wild Swans. English translation by Jean Hersholt

1838 books
1838 short stories
1839 books
1839 short stories
1841 books
1841 short stories
Collections of fairy tales
1830s children's books
1840s children's books
Short stories by Hans Christian Andersen
Danish children's literature